Mathathane is a village in Central District of Botswana. It is located in the eastern tip of Botswana, close to the border with South Africa. The population was 1,845 in 2001 census.

References

Populated places in Central District (Botswana)
Villages in Botswana